Bloomfield Township may refer to:

 Bloomfield Township, LaGrange County, Indiana
 Bloomfield Township, Clinton County, Iowa
 Bloomfield Township, Polk County, Iowa
 Bloomfield Township, Winneshiek County, Iowa
 Bloomfield Township, Mitchell County, Kansas, in Mitchell County, Kansas
 Bloomfield Township, Sheridan County, Kansas
 Bloomfield Township, Huron County, Michigan
 Bloomfield Township, Missaukee County, Michigan
 Bloomfield Township, Oakland County, Michigan
 Bloomfield Township, Fillmore County, Minnesota
 Bloomfield Township, New Jersey
 Bloomfield Township, Traill County, North Dakota, in Traill County, North Dakota
 Bloomfield Township, Jackson County, Ohio
 Bloomfield Township, Logan County, Ohio
 Bloomfield Township, Trumbull County, Ohio
 Bloomfield Township, Bedford County, Pennsylvania
 Bloomfield Township, Crawford County, Pennsylvania

See also  
 Blumfield Township, Saginaw County, Michigan

Township name disambiguation pages